Sesuvium portulacastrum is a sprawling perennial herb in the family Aizoaceae that grows in coastal and mangrove areas throughout much of the world. It grows in sandy clay, coastal limestone and sandstone, tidal flats and salt marshes, throughout much of the world. It is native to Africa, Asia, Australia, Hawai`i, North America and South America, and has naturalised in many places where it is not indigenous.

It is commonly known as shoreline purslane or (ambiguously) "sea purslane," in English, dampalit in Tagalog and  hǎimǎchǐ in Chinese.

Description 

Its flowers come from at the leaf axils, they are tiny,  in diameter and pink or purple in colour. They close at night time or when the sky is cloudy, they are pollinated by bees and moths.

The fruit is a round capsule, it has tiny black seeds that do not float.

Taxonomy 
It was first published as Portulaca portulacastrum by Carl Linnaeus in 1753. Six years later Linnaeus transferred it into Sesuvium, and it has remained at that name ever since, with the exception of an unsuccessful 1891 attempt by Otto Kuntze to transfer the species into a new genus as Halimus portulacastrum.

Chemistry and medicine 
Fatty acid composition:-
palmitic acid  (31.18%),   oleic acid (21.15%), linolenic acid (14.18%) linoleic acid (10.63%), myristic acid (6.91%) and behenic acid (2.42%)
The plant extract showed antibacterial and anticandidal activities and moderate antifungal activity.

Human consumption 

Sesuvium portulacastrum is eaten in the Philippines, where it is called dampalit in Tagalog and "bilang" or "bilangbilang" in the Visayan language. The plant is primarily pickled and eaten as atchara (sweet traditional pickles).

References

External links
Online Field guide to Common Saltmarsh Plants of Queensland

portulacastrum
Caryophyllales of Australia
Flora of Europe
Flora of Asia
Flora of Africa
Flora of South America
Flora of North America
Medicinal plants
Plants described in 1759
Taxa named by Carl Linnaeus